The 7th Annual Grammy Awards were held on April 13, 1965, at Beverly Hilton Hotel, Beverly Hills. They recognized accomplishments of musicians for the year 1964. João Gilberto & Stan Getz won 4 awards.

Award winners
Record of the Year
Astrud Gilberto & Stan Getz for "The Girl from Ipanema"
Album of the Year
João Gilberto & Stan Getz for Getz/Gilberto
Song of the Year
Jerry Herman (songwriter) for "Hello, Dolly!" performed by Louis Armstrong
Best New Artist
The Beatles

Children's
Best Recording for Children
Julie Andrews, Dick Van Dyke, Glynis Johns, David Tomlinson & Ed Wynn for Mary Poppins

Classical
Best Performance - Orchestra
Erich Leinsdorf (conductor) & the Boston Symphony Orchestra for Mahler: Symphony No. 5/Berg: Wozzeck Excerpts
Best Vocal Soloist Performance (with or without orchestra)
Fritz Reiner (conductor), Leontyne Price & the Chicago Symphony Orchestra for Berlioz: Nuits d'Ete (Song Cycle)/Falla: El Amor Brujo
Best Opera Recording
Herbert von Karajan (conductor) Franco Corelli, Mirella Freni, Robert Merrill, Leontyne Price & the Vienna Philharmonic Orchestra for Bizet: Carmen
Best Choral Performance (other than opera)
Robert Shaw (choir director) & the Robert Shaw Chorale for Britten: A Ceremony of Carols
Best Performance - Instrumental Soloist or Soloists (with orchestra)
Eugene Ormandy (conductor), Isaac Stern & the Philadelphia Orchestra for Prokofiev: Violin Concerto No. 1 in D
Best Performance - Instrumental Soloist or Soloists (without orchestra)
Vladimir Horowitz for Vladimir Horowitz Plays Beethoven, Debussy, Chopin
Best Chamber Music Performance - Vocal
Noah Greenberg (conductor) & the New York Pro Musica for It Was a Lover and His Lass
Best Chamber Music Performance - Instrumental
Jascha Heifetz, Jacob Lateiner & Gregor Piatigorsky  for Beethoven: Trio No. 1 in E Flat, Op.1 #1
Best Composition by a Contemporary Composer
Samuel Barber for Concerto performed by John Browning
Best Classical Album
Leonard Bernstein (conductor) & the New York Philharmonic for Bernstein: Symphony No. 3 "Kaddish"
Most Promising New Classical Recording Artist
Marilyn Horne

Comedy
Best Comedy Performance
Bill Cosby for I Started Out as a Child

Composing and arranging
Best Instrumental Composition (other than jazz)
Henry Mancini (composer) for "The Pink Panther Theme"
Best Original Score Written for a Motion Picture or Television Show
Richard M. Sherman & Robert B. Sherman (composers) for Mary Poppins performed by Julie Andrews, Dick Van Dyke & various artists
Best Instrumental Arrangement
Henry Mancini (arranger) for "The Pink Panther  Theme"
Best Accompaniment Arrangement for Vocalist(s) or Instrumentalist(s)
Peter Matz (arranger) for "People" performed by Barbra Streisand

Country
Best Country & Western Vocal Performance - Female
Dottie West for "Here Comes My Baby"
Best Country & Western Vocal Performance - Male
Roger Miller for "Dang Me"
Best Country & Western Single
Roger Miller for "Dang Me"
Best Country & Western Song
Roger Miller (songwriter) for "Dang Me"
Best Country & Western Album
Roger Miller for Dang Me/Chug-A-Lug
Best New Country & Western Artist
Roger Miller

Folk
Best Folk Recording
Gale Garnett for We'll Sing in the Sunshine

Gospel
Best Gospel or Other Religious Recording (Musical)
Tennessee Ernie Ford for Great Gospel Songs

Jazz
Best Instrumental Jazz Performance - Small Group or Soloist with Small Group
Stan Getz for Getz/Gilberto
Best Instrumental Jazz Performance - Large Group or Soloist with Large Group
Laurindo Almeida for Guitar from Ipanema
Best Original Jazz Composition
Lalo Schifrin (composer) for "The Cat"

Musical show
Best Score From an Original Cast Show Album
Jule Styne & Robert Merrill (composers) & the original cast (Barbra Streisand, Sydney Chaplin, Danny Meehan, Kay Medford, Jean Stapleton & John Lankston) for Funny Girl

Packaging and notes
Best Album Cover - Classical
Robert M. Jones (art director) & Jan Balet (graphic artist) for Saint-Saens: Carnival of the Animals/Britten: Young Person's Guide to the Orchestra conducted by Arthur Fiedler
Best Album Cover - Other Than Classical
Robert Cato (art director) & Don Bronstein (photographer) for People performed by Barbra Streisand
Best Album Notes
Stanton Catlin (album notes writer) for Mexico (Legacy Collection) performed by Carlos Chavez

Pop
Best Vocal Performance, Female
Barbra Streisand for People
Best Vocal Performance, Male
Louis Armstrong for "Hello, Dolly!"
Best Performance by a Vocal Group
The Beatles for A Hard Day's Night
Best Performance by a Chorus
Ward Swingle for The Swingle Singers Going Baroque performed by The Swingle Singers
Best Instrumental Performance - Non-Jazz
Henry Mancini for "The Pink Panther Theme"
Best Rock and Roll Recording
Petula Clark for "Downtown"

Production and engineering
Best Engineered Recording - Non-Classical
Phil Ramone (engineer) for Getz/Gilberto performed by Stan Getz & João Gilberto
Best Engineered Recording
Douglas Larter (engineer), Carlo Maria Giulini (conductor) & the Philharmonia Orchestra for Britten: Young Person's Guide to the Orchestra
Best Engineered Recording - Special or Novel Effects
David Hassinger (engineer) for The Chipmunks Sing the Beatles performed by The Chipmunks

R&B
Best Rhythm & Blues Recording
Nancy Wilson for "(You Don't Know) How Glad I Am"

Spoken
Best Documentary, Spoken Word or Drama Recording (other than comedy)
That Was The Week That Was for BBC Tribute to John F. Kennedy performed by the That Was the Week That Was cast

References

 007
1965 in California
1965 music awards
Beverly Hills, California
1965 in American music
April 1965 events in the United States